Turner's All Night Drugstore (Rare & Unreleased 1987–1997) is a compilation album by Benestrophe, released on October 26, 2018 by Alfa Matrix.

Reception
Side-Line magazine awarded Turner's All Night Drugstore (Rare & Unreleased 1987–1997) a seven out of ten and described Benestrophe's music as "dark and sophisticated".

Track listing

Personnel
Adapted from the Turner's All Night Drugstore (Rare & Unreleased 1987–1997) liner notes.

 Gary Dassing – compiling

Release history

References

External links 
 
 Turner's All Night Drugstore (Rare & Unreleased 1987–1997) at Bandcamp
 Turner's All Night Drugstore (Rare & Unreleased 1987–1997) at iTunes

2018 compilation albums
Benestrophe albums
Alfa Matrix compilation albums